Kirt Stanley Ojala (born December 24, 1968) is an American former Major League Baseball (MLB) left-handed pitcher who played for the Florida Marlins from 1997 to 1999, and is remembered for being the pitcher who gave up the 400th career home run to Barry Bonds.

Amateur career
Ojala was born in Kalamazoo, Michigan, and graduated from Portage Central High School and the University of Michigan. In 1989, he played collegiate summer baseball with the Harwich Mariners of the Cape Cod Baseball League. He was selected by the New York Yankees in the 4th round of the 1990 MLB Draft.

Professional career
A knuckleball specialist, Ojala pitched mostly in long relief, although he made 5 starts for the Marlins in 1997 after being called up from the minor league Charlotte Knights, and 13 the following year. On August 23, 1998, he gave up a solo home run to Bonds in the top of the third inning in Pro Player Stadium, giving Bonds 400 homers for his career.

On September 16, 1998 Ojala became one of only 50 major league pitchers to strike out four batters in a single inning. He spent time in the Cincinnati Reds organization prior to the Marlins. Following his release by Florida, he briefly was a member of the Boston Red Sox. He finished with a career record of 3 wins and 10 losses and a career batting average of .121.

See also
 List of Major League Baseball single-inning strikeout leaders

References

External links

Florida Marlins players
Major League Baseball pitchers
Knuckleball pitchers
Michigan Wolverines baseball players
Harwich Mariners players
Sportspeople from Kalamazoo, Michigan
Baseball players from Michigan
Businesspeople from Grand Rapids, Michigan
1968 births
Living people
Albany-Colonie Yankees players
American expatriate baseball players in Canada
Calgary Cannons players
Charlotte Knights players
Columbus Clippers players
Indianapolis Indians players
Oneonta Yankees players
Prince William Cannons players
Trenton Thunder players